Ricky Robertson (born September 19, 1990, in Hernando, Mississippi) is an American track and field athlete who competes in the high jump. Ricky made his Olympic debut at the 2016 Summer Olympics placed 17th clearing a bar , and placed 16th clearing  at 2017 World Championships in Athletics – Men's high jump. Ricky Robertson earned 10 NCAA Division I All-American awards and 14 Southeastern Conference all conference awards as an Ole Miss Rebel.

Professional
Ricky made Team USA at 2016 U.S. Olympic Trials (track and field) in the high jump clearing . Ricky made his Olympic debut at the 2016 Summer Olympics after clearing the Olympic standard  at Chula Vista Olympic Training Center in June 2016.

Ricky made Team USA after clearing the World Indoor standard and placing fourth at 2016 USA Indoor Track and Field Championships in the high jump clearing . At 2016 IAAF World Indoor Championships – Men's high jump, he placed twelfth in the high jump clearing .

Ricky jumped a season best at 2015 USA Outdoor Track and Field Championships in the high jump clearing  finished 7th.

Ricky finished 8th at 2014 USA Outdoor Track and Field Championships in the high jump clearing .

Ricky finished 15th at 2012 U.S. Olympic Trials (track and field) in the high jump clearing .

NCAA
Ricky graduated from University of Mississippi. Ricky improved at Ole Miss in 2010 2011 2012 2013 

Ricky Robertson high jumped a world leader in April 2012 at Florida Relays.

Ricky Robertson earned all American honors bestowed by USTFCCCA in 
 2 times in 2013, 
 4 times in 2012, 
 2 times in 2011, 
 2 times in 2010.

Ricky Robertson earned all Southeastern Conference honors 15 times: 
 High jump (8 times), 
 Triple jump (4 times), 
 Long jump (3 times).

At the 2010 NACAC Under-23 Championships in Athletics, Ricky placed second in the high jump clearing .

Prep
Ricky graduated from Hernando High School (Mississippi).

References

External links

1991 births
Living people
People from Hernando, Mississippi
Track and field athletes from Mississippi
American male high jumpers
African-American male track and field athletes
Olympic track and field athletes of the United States
Athletes (track and field) at the 2016 Summer Olympics
Ole Miss Rebels men's track and field athletes
21st-century African-American sportspeople